The chief justice of the Philippines presides over the Supreme Court of the Philippines and is the highest judicial officer of the government of the Philippines. 
As of April 5, 2021, the position is currently held by Alexander Gesmundo, who was appointed by President Rodrigo Duterte following the early retirement of his predecessor Diosdado Peralta in March 2021.

The chief justice, who was first named on June 11, 1901, in the person of Cayetano Arellano, is the oldest existing major governmental office continually held by a Filipino, preceding the presidency and vice presidency (1935), senators (1916, or as the Taft Commission, on September 1, 1901) and the members of the House of Representatives (1907 as the Philippine Assembly).

Duties and powers
The power to appoint the chief justice lies with the president of the Philippines, who makes the selection from a list of three nominees prepared by the Judicial and Bar Council. There is no material difference in the process of selecting a chief justice from that in the selection of associate justices. As with the other justices of the Supreme Court, the chief justice is obliged to retire upon reaching the age of 70; otherwise there is no term limit for the chief justice. In the 1935 constitution, any person appointed by the president has to be confirmed by the Commission on Appointments; in the 1973 constitution, the person whom the president appointed did not have to undergo confirmation under the Commission on Appointments.

The current 1987 constitution does not ascribe any formal role to the chief justice other than as an ex-officio chairman of the Judicial and Bar Council and as the presiding officer in any impeachment trial of the president. The chief justice is also required to personally certify every decision that is rendered by the court. The chief justice carries only 1 vote out of 15 in the court, and is generally regarded, vis-a-vis the other justices, as the primus inter pares rather than as the administrative superior of the other members of the court.

Still, the influence a chief justice may bear within the court and judiciary, and on the national government cannot be underestimated. In the public eye, any particular Supreme Court is widely identified with the identity of the incumbent chief justice, hence appellations such as "The Fernando Court" or "The Puno Court". Moreover, the chief justice usually retains high public visibility, unlike the associate justices, who tend to labor in relative anonymity, with exceptions such as Associate Justice J. B. L. Reyes in the 1950s to 1970s.

By tradition, it is also the chief justice who swears into office the president of the Philippines. One notable deviation from that tradition came in 1986, and later again in 2010. Due to the exceptional political circumstances culminating in the People Power Revolution, on February 25, 1986, Corazon Aquino took her oath of office as president before Associate Justice Claudio Teehankee in San Juan just minutes before Ferdinand Marcos took his own oath of office also as president before Chief Justice Ramon Aquino. Marcos fled into exile later that night. More than two decades afterwards, Benigno Simeon Aquino III followed in his mother's footsteps (with almost similar reasons) by having Associate Justice Conchita Carpio-Morales administer his oath of office, rather than Chief Justice Renato Corona (who was eventually impeached halfway through Aquino's term). Six years later, in 2016, Rodrigo Duterte took his oath of office before Associate Justice Bienvenido Reyes, his classmate at San Beda College of Law, instead of Chief Justice Maria Lourdes Sereno (who would eventually be removed from her position through quo warranto after it was determined that she had been unlawfully holding office ab initio).

The chief justice also names the three justices each from the Supreme Court in the memberships of the House of Representatives Electoral Tribunal and the Senate Electoral Tribunal.

The chief justice is the chief executive officer of the Philippine judiciary system and together with the whole Supreme
Court, exercises administrative supervision over all courts and personnel.

List

 José Abad Santos was unable to preside over the Supreme Court due to the outbreak of World War II.
 Renato Corona was impeached on December 12, 2011, and convicted on May 29, 2012, removing him from office.
 Senior Associate Justice Antonio Carpio served as acting chief justice after the Impeachment of Renato Corona from May 30, 2012 to August 25, 2012 and after the removal of Maria Lourdes Sereno via quo warranto proceedings from May 14, 2018 to August 25, 2018.
 Maria Lourdes Sereno was removed on May 11, 2018 via quo warranto by a special en banc session; the petition alleged Sereno's appointment was void ab initio due to her failure in complying with the requirements of the Judicial and Bar Council. Hence her entire term as chief justice is considered a de facto tenure; legally void since the ouster of her predecessor. Sereno filed an ad cautelam motion for reconsideration pleading for the reversal of the decision on May 31, 2018, but on June 19, 2018 was denied with finality (meaning no further pleading shall be entertained, as well as for the immediate entry for judgment) for lack of merit.
 As a result of Republic v. Sereno, Maria Lourdes Sereno is no longer considered the 24th chief justice of the Philippines, as the court ruled that her appointment was never legal but null and void ab initio. Thus, on August 25, 2018, Teresita de Castro was appointed by President Rodrigo Duterte as the new de jure and 24th chief justice of the Supreme Court of the Philippines.

Acting Chief Justices
The following became Senior Associate Justices in their tenure in the Supreme Court:

Demographics

Longevity

By age group

By gender

By appointing president

By law school

Notable chief justices
 José Yulo is the only former speaker of the House of Representatives to be subsequently appointed as chief justice. Another, Querube Makalintal, would be elected as Speaker of the Interim Batasang Pambansa (parliament) after his retirement from the court. On the other hand, Marcelo Fernan would, after his resignation from the court, be elected to the Senate and later serve as president of the Senate. Other chief justices served in prominent positions in public service after their retirement include Manuel Moran (ambassador to Spain and the Vatican), and Hilario Davide, Jr. (ambassador to the United Nations). In addition, César Bengzon was elected as the first Filipino to sit as a judge on the International Court of Justice shortly after his retirement in 1966.
 Roberto Concepcion was reputedly so disappointed with the court's ruling in Javellana v. Executive Secretary where the majority affirmed the validity of the 1973 Constitution despite recognizing the flaws in its ratification, that he retired two months prior to his reaching the mandatory retirement age of 70. Thirteen years later, after the ouster of Marcos, the 83-year-old Concepcion was appointed a member of the 1986 Constitutional Commission tasked with drafting a new constitution. Drawing from his experiences as chief justice in the early days of martial law, Concepcion introduced several new innovations designed to assure the independence of the Supreme Court, such as the Judicial and Bar Council and the express conferment on the court the power to review any acts of government.
 The longest period one person served as chief justice was 18 years, 294 days in the case of Cayetano Arellano, who served from 1901 to 1920. Arellano was 73 years, 29 days old upon his resignation, the greatest age ever reached by an incumbent chief justice, and a record unlikely to be broken with the current mandatory retirement age of 70.
 The shortest tenure of any chief justice was of Teresita Leonardo-de Castro, who served as chief justice for a mere 43 days upon reaching her mandatory retirement age of 70. The previous record was that of Pedro Yap, who served as chief justice for 73 days in 1988. Other chief justices who served for less than a year were Felix Makasiar (85 days), Ramon Aquino (78 days), and Artemio Panganiban (352 days). Of these chief justices, all but Aquino left office upon reaching the mandatory retirement age of 70; Aquino resigned in 1986 after the newly installed President Corazon Aquino asked for the courtesy resignations of all the members of the court.
 The oldest person appointed as chief justice was Teresita Leonardo-de Castro, who was 69 years, 324 days old upon his appointment in 2018. Other persons appointed as chief justice in their 69th year were Pedro Yap (69 years, 292 days old); Felix Makasiar (69 years, 280 days old); Artemio Panganiban (69 years, 13 days old); and Lucas Bersamin (69 years, 41 days). The youngest person named as chief justice was Manuel Moran, who was 51 years, 256 days old upon his appointment.
 Claudio Teehankee had to wait for nearly 18 years as associate justice before he was appointed as chief justice. He was twice bypassed by Ferdinand Marcos in favor a more junior associate justice before he was finally appointed chief justice by Corazon Aquino. Of the Filipino associate justices, Florentino Torres and J. B. L. Reyes served over 18 years in the court without becoming chief justice. In contrast, Pedro Yap had served as associate justice for only 2 years, 10 days before he was promoted as chief justice.
 The longest-lived chief justice was César Bengzon, who died in 1992 aged 96 years, 97 days old. Two other chief justices lived past 90: Ricardo Paras (93 years, 235 days) and Querube Makalintal (91 years, 322 days).
 The youngest chief justice to die was José Abad Santos, who was executed by the Japanese army in 1942 at age 56 years, 77 days. The youngest chief justice to die from non-violent causes was Fred Ruiz Castro, who died in 1979 of a heart attack inflight to India, at age 64 years, 231 days. Abad Santos, Castro, and Manuel Araullo are the only chief justices to die while in office.
 The first chief justice to be impeached is Renato Corona. On December 12, 2011, 188 of the 285 members of House of Representatives voted to transmit to the Senate the Articles of Impeachment filed against him. On May 29, 2012, the Senate, voting 20–3, convicted Corona under Article II pertaining to his failure to disclose to the public his statement of assets, liabilities, and net worth.
 Maria Lourdes Sereno was the first female appointed to serve as chief justice, following the impeachment of Renato Corona and deliberations by the Judicial and Bar Council in 2012 (her successor Teresita Leonardo-de Castro is the de jure first female chief justice). If not for the quo warranto petition which was granted on May 11, 2018, that removed her from the post as well as voiding her appointment and declaring her tenure as a de facto term, she would have been the second chief justice to similarly undergo impeachment proceedings as her late predecessor, Corona. Her ouster was made final on June 19, 2018, by the denial with finality (meaning no further pleading would be entertained, as well as for the immediate entry for judgment) of her ad cautelam motion for reconsideration filed on May 31, 2018, pleading for the reversal of her ouster via quo warranto.

Timeline

See also
 Associate Justice of the Supreme Court of the Philippines
 Supreme Court of the Philippines
 Constitution of the Philippines
 Justices of the Supreme Court of the Philippines

References

Further reading
 The Supreme Court E-library
 The Chief Justice on the Official Gazette of the Philippines
 
 
 

Supreme Court of the Philippines
Chief justice
 
Political office-holders in the Philippines